Rinzia  is a  genus of flowering plants in the family Myrtaceae. The genus was first formally described in 1843 and reinstated and revised in 1986.

Species list 
The following names are accepted by Plants of the World Online as at January 2022:
 Rinzia affinis Trudgen
 Rinzia carnosa (S.Moore) Trudgen
 Rinzia communis Trudgen 
 Rinzia crassifolia Turcz. 
 Rinzia dimorphandra (F.Muell. ex Benth.) Trudgen
 Rinzia ericaea (F.Muell.) Rye
 Rinzia ericaea (F.Muell.) Ryesubsp. ericaea Rye & Trudgen
 Rinzia ericaea subsp. insularis Rye
 Rinzia fimbriolata Rye
 Rinzia fumana Schauer 
 Rinzia icosandra (F.Muell. ex Benth.) Rye
 Rinzia longifolia Turcz. 
 Rinzia medifila Rye & Trudgen 
 Rinzia orientalis Rye
 Rinzia oxycoccoides Turcz.
 Rinzia polystemonea (F.Muell.) Rye
 Rinzia rubra Trudgen	
 Rinzia schollerifolia (Lehm.) Trudgen 
 Rinzia sessilis Trudgen
 Rinzia torquata Rye & Trudgen
 Rinzia triplex Rye & Trudgen

References

 
Endemic flora of Western Australia
Myrtaceae genera
Myrtales of Australia
Rosids of Western Australia